Magical Mystery or: The Return of Karl Schmidt is a 2017 German comedy-drama film based on a novel by Sven Regener.

Plot
After recovering from a phase of drug induced mental illness Karl Schmidt (Charly Hübner) meets his old friends from the music business. Ferdi (Detlev Buck) convinces him to be the driver for the techno DJ team on a tour through Germany.

Cast
 Charly Hübner - Karl Schmidt
  - Rosa
 Detlev Buck - Ferdi
 Marc Hosemann - Raimund Schulte
   - Basti
 Jacob Matschenz - Holger

References

External links 

2017 comedy-drama films
German comedy-drama films